Sandra Neves (born 10 June 1969) is a Portuguese swimmer. She competed in the women's 100 metre butterfly and the women's 200 metre butterfly events at the 1988 Summer Olympics.

References

External links
 

1969 births
Living people
Portuguese female swimmers
Female butterfly swimmers
Olympic swimmers of Portugal
Swimmers at the 1988 Summer Olympics
Place of birth missing (living people)